Splat the rat, also known as bat the rat, is a simple variant on a bat and ball game that can be played at parties or fêtes. 

An open-ended metal or plastic tube or section of drainpipe is mounted on a board so that it is almost vertical. A rat-shaped object is introduced by its "tail" into the upper end of the tube; the player's objective is to strike it before it falls to the ground, usually using a stick or other kind of bat. The game is a traditional stall at fêtes.

In popular culture 
The 2007 British feature film Hot Fuzz features a summer fête with a splat the rat stall.

References

Carnival games
Games of physical skill
Party games